Stixx are crisp wafer sticks with candy creme filling attached to the inside and Nestlé chocolate coating attached to the outside. The brand was owned by Nestlé, who sold it to by Brynwood Partners' DeMet's Candy Company in 2008. In 2013, Brynwood sold the company to Yıldız Holding.

Products available in the North American retail market are:

 Butterfinger Stixx
 Nestlé Crunch Stixx
 Nestlé Crunch Dark Stixx

References

American confectionery